Anna Blinkova defeated Jasmine Paolini in the final, 6–2, 3–6, 6–2 to win the singles tennis title at the 2022 Transylvania Open. It was her maiden WTA Tour singles title, and she won it as a qualifier.

Anett Kontaveit was the reigning champion, but did not participate this year.

Seeds

Draw

Finals

Top half

Bottom half

Qualifying

Seeds

Qualifiers

Lucky losers

Qualifying draw

First qualifier

Second qualifier

Third qualifier

Fourth qualifier

Fifth qualifier

Sixth qualifier

References

External links
Main draw
 Qualifying draw

Transylvania Open - Singles